Nikolay Havrylovych Shmatko (17 August 1943 – 15 September 2020) was a Ukrainian sculptor and painter. He was born in the Donetsk region of Ukraine.

Biography
Shmatko became a sculptor at the age of 33, having previously been a firefighter. In 1996 he met the famous model and gallerist Dina Vierny in France, who predicted his great future and advised him "not to scatter his works worldwide". During all his creative development Nikolai Shmatko created more than 750 various monuments  and about 500 pictures. 

He worked in marble, inspired by European culture and art. His studio and gallery contain 100 sculptures (more than 70 of which are made of Ural and Italian marble); 30 plaster casts; and about 300 pictures (including paintings, graphics, and architectural designs). In total, there are approximately 750 pieces, ranging from simple decorations to bas-relief and high relief busts and sculptures. Some of these pieces are sexually explicit and even pornographic. Shmatko also worked in architecture, and had a design for a penis-shaped high-rise building.

In 2004, for his work "Sviatohorska Blessed Virgin" - a statue of the Virgin Mary (Theotokos "Hegumenia") for Sviato-Uspenskyi Sviatohorskyi Monastery - Shmatko was awarded the order of Nestor Letopisets by Volodymyr Sabodan, the Kyiv Metropolitan, and all of Ukraine.

In the autumn of 2005 the Transfiguration church was opened in the village of Keleberda, Poltava region. Exclusively for this church, the sculptor created a marble sculpture "The Crucifixion".

In autumn 2012, at the invitation of oligarch Viktor Baloha, Shmatko moved with his family to the city of Mukachevo.

Exhibitions 
 2007: Biennale di Firenze 2007, Italy; received 4th place award in sculpture and installation
 2009: Biennale di Firenze 2009, Italy; Participating Artists 2009
 2012: ArtMonaco 2012, Monaco; Exposants - Exhibitors, Art Monaco 2012 (page 160)

Works in public collections
 Shmatko's bust of Ivan Maksymovych Soshenko is stored in the museum of Taras Hryhorovych Shevchenko Imperial Academy of Arts in Saint Petersburg.

References

External links
 Official website
 Official website of HRH Princess Basmah Bint Saud
 Sculpture Gives Yulia Nude Treatment
 Radio Liberty interview

1943 births
2020 deaths
People from Krasnohorivka
20th-century sculptors
20th-century Ukrainian painters
20th-century Ukrainian male artists
21st-century Ukrainian painters
21st-century Ukrainian male artists
Sculpture galleries in Ukraine
Soviet painters
Soviet sculptors
Modern sculptors
Ukrainian sculptors
Ukrainian male sculptors
Ukrainian male painters